This is a list of contestants who have appeared on the Australian television show Australia's Next Top Model. The show is hosted by model Jennifer Hawkins and her panel of judges, and contestants compete to win a modeling contract with a top modeling agency and along with other prizes. The series first aired in 2005 and as of 2016, ten seasons have aired. A total of 135 different participants have been selected as finalists in the show in its ten years running, with  ten girls (Gemma Sanderson, Eboni Stocks, Alice Burdeu, Demelza Reveley, Tahnee Atkinson, Amanda Ware, Montana Cox, Melissa Juratowitch, Brittany Beattie and Aleyna FitzGerald) crowned Australia's Next Top Model.

Contestants

References

Australia's Next Top Model seasons
Australian television-related lists
Australia's Next Top Model contestants